Phellinus viticola is a species of fungus belonging to the family Hymenochaetaceae.

Synonym:
 Polyporus viticola Schwein, 1828 (= basionym)

References

viticola